Apocalypse is a genre of revelatory literature, or a large-scale catastrophic event.

Apocalypse may also refer to:

Amusement rides
Apocalypse (Drayton Manor), in England
Apocalypse (Six Flags America), formerly at Six Flags America
Apocalypse: The Ride, at Six Flags Magic Mountain

Film
 Apocalypse (film series), an eschatological film franchise 
 Apocalypse (film), 1998
 The Apocalypse (2000 film), a biblical TV film
 Apocalypse: The Second World War, a 2009 French documentary
 Resident Evil: Apocalypse, a 2004 film 
 Superman/Batman: Apocalypse, a 2010 animated film
 X-Men: Apocalypse, a 2016 film
 This Is the End, a 2013 film, working title The Apocalypse

Gaming
 Apocalypse: The Game of Nuclear Devastation, a board game released in 1980
 Apocalypse: The Game of Nuclear Devastation (video game), a 1983 video game based on the board game
 Apocalypse (chess variant)
 Apocalypse (Magic: The Gathering), an expansion set of the card game
 Apocalypse (video game),  1998
 Apocalypse (1990 video game)
 Apocalypse, an expansion for Call of Duty: Black Ops II 
 Shin Megami Tensei IV: Apocalypse, a 2016 role-playing video game
 Warhammer 40,000 Apocalypse, an expansion for the wargame
 Werewolf: The Apocalypse, a role-playing game 
 X-COM: Apocalypse, a 1997 PC strategy game

Literature

Apocalypse, a 1931 commentary on the Book of Revelation by D. H. Lawrence
Apocalypse (Bowler novel), 2004 
 Apocalypse (Star Wars novel), 2012
 Apocalypses, a 1977 collection of two fantasy novellas by R. A. Lafferty

Music
 Apocalypse (band), a Brazilian progressive rock band
Apocalypse (Apocalypse album), 1991
 Apocalypse (Bill Callahan album), 2011
 Apocalypse (Mahavishnu Orchestra album), 1974
 Apocalypse (Primal Fear album) or the title song, 2018
 Apocalypse (Thundercat album), 2013
 Apocalypse: Save Us, 2022
 "Apocalypse", a song by Cigarettes After Sex from Cigarettes After Sex, 2017
 "Apocalypse", by Jesper Kyd from the video game Hitman: Blood Money, 2006
 "Apocalypse", by Lacuna Coil from Black Anima, 2019
 "The Apocalypse", by Lovebites from The Lovebites EP, 2017

Television
 "Derren Brown: Apocalypse", a 2012 British two-part series
 10.5: Apocalypse, a 2006 American miniseries
 American Horror Story: Apocalypse, a season of the American anthology series
 "Apocalypse" (Bottom), a 1991 episode
 Apocalypse: the Cold War, a 2019 French TV series
 Apocalypse: Hitler, a 2011 French TV series
 Apocalypse: Stalin, a 2015 French TV series 
 Apocalypse: World War I, a 2014 French TV series
 Apocalypse: The Second World War, a 2009 French TV series
 Apocalypse: Never-Ending War 1918–1926, a 2018 French TV series
 "Apocalypse", a 2008 episode of Smallville

Other uses
Apocalypse (Dürer), a series of woodcuts by Albrecht Dürer
Apocalypse (character), a Marvel Comics supervillain
Apocalypse in other media
Apocalypsis (moth), a genus of moths
Climate apocalypse, a postulated global collapse of human civilization as a result of climate change.

See also

 Apocalypse Now (disambiguation)
 Book of Revelation, also called the Apocalypse of John
 Alpocalypse, an album by "Weird Al" Yankovic
 Apokolips, the fictional planet in DC Comics
 List of dates predicted for apocalyptic events